Canals of the United Kingdom; see also Canals of the United Kingdom.

The following list includes some systems that are navigable rivers with sections of canal (e.g. Aire and Calder Navigation) as well as "completely" artificial canals (e.g. Rochdale Canal).

Canals in England

Canals in Northern Ireland

Canals in Scotland

Canals in Wales

Proposed canal routes

Active projects
 Bedford and Milton Keynes Waterway: Connection from Grand Union Canal at Milton Keynes to the River Great Ouse near Bedford. This link will finally enable broad-beam boats to travel from the north to the south of the inland waterway network.
 Fens Waterways Link: The Fens Waterways Link comprises several new waterways and improvements to current routes. It will create new circular routes and in conjunction with the Milton Keynes and Bedford Waterway, it will  be connected to the rest of the country's waterways via the Great Ouse.
 Maidenhead Waterways: Making the York Stream and other parts of the Maidenhead Waterways fully navigable for boats and linking to other nearby canals and navigable rivers.

Proposals
 Grand Union Canal (Slough Branch): Extending Slough Arm of the Grand Union Canal south to join the River Thames.
 Rother Link: Planned canal which would connect the Chesterfield Canal at Killamarsh, via the River Rother through to the Sheffield and South Yorkshire Navigation, thus creating a new cruising ring and encouraging boats to visit the Chesterfield Canal.
 Upper Avon Extension (Warwick): This proposed connection from River Avon to Grand Union Canal via Warwick is subject to some landowner opposition.
 Foxton Inclined Plane: Restoration of the wide-beam Foxton Inclined Plane, accompanied by a solution to bypass Watford Locks, would allow wide-beam boats to traverse the Leicester Line of the Grand Union Canal.

Former proposals
 Grand Contour Canal: First proposed in 1943, was intended to connect the major industrial centres of London, Bristol, Southampton, Coventry, Birmingham, Nottingham, Derby, Chester, Manchester, Blackburn, Bradford, Hartlepool and Newcastle.
 London to Portsmouth canal: Also known as the Grand Southern Canal, and proposed on several occasions, this route would utilise existing canals and rivers, with new links constructed, to provide an overland route between the cities of London and Portsmouth, removing the need to enter the English Channel.
 Berks & Hants Canal, a proposed link from the terminus of the Basingstoke Canal at Basingstoke to the Kennet and Avon Canal, rejected twice by Parliament after landowner opposition.
 Polbrock Canal, approved by Parliament in the 1790s, this link between the north and south coasts of Cornwall would have joined the River Camel with the Fowey at Bodmin.

See also

List of canal tunnels in the United Kingdom
Waterway restoration in the United Kingdom
List of rivers in the United Kingdom

References

Canals in the United Kingdom
United Kingdom
Canals
Canal
Canals